Tousey is a surname. Notable people with the surname include:

 Frank Tousey (1853–1902), American publisher
 Richard Tousey (1908–1997), American astronomer
 Sheila Tousey (born 1959), Native American actress

See also
 Benjamin C. Tousey House
 Camp Tousey, summer camp